Jamil Azzaoui (in Arabic جميل عزاوي), also known mononymously as Jamil (born 17 May 1961) is a Canadian humorous artist / comedian, musician (guitarist) and an artist agent of Moroccan origin living in Montreal and well known in France and the francophone countries.

Being born to a Muslim Moroccan father and a Québécoise Catholic mother, he lived his childhood in various countries including Egypt, France where he studied at École royale militaire de Sorèze, and Morocco, he returned to Canada and studied at Promédia, an arts school in Montreal.

After graduation, in 1981 he became a morning radio personality at CIBL-FM and later on CINQ-FM Radio Centre-Ville. In 1985, he married Catherine Karnas. Catherine, a singer, was promoted by her husband. They were divorced later. He became an agent for many artists through his company "Pépé Inc".

He also has his own series of recordings. His album Pitié pour les femmes was a big success. The follow-up Pitie pour les bums was a similar success. His song "Un signe de toi" featured in the hit parades of several stations including Rythme FM. Other humorous songs followed including "Pitié pour les femmes", "Fuck, faut qu'tu changes", "C'est pas moi ça".

In 2005, he made 100 appearances in 18 months throughout Quebec and a concert in Les FrancoFolies de Montréal and at the Lion d'or also in Montréal. In 2008, he had a show "Pitié pour les femmes" at the Olympia theatre of Montreal, He has also collaborated with many artists for various joint recordings.

He was the Green Party of Canada candidate in Laurier—Sainte-Marie for the 2019 Canadian federal election.

Discography 

 1996: Pépé Inc. Greatest Hits
 2004: Pitié pour les femmes
 2005: Pitié pour les bums!
 2006: Je dure... Très, très dur...
 2009: À bas les roses!!!

Awards / Nominations
Nominated for "Album of the Year (Humour)" and "Show of the Year (Humour)" at the ADISQ Annual Gala in 2009

Electoral record

References

External links 
 Jamil MySpace
 Biography on Québec Info Musique

1961 births
Canadian male singers
French-language singers of Canada
Living people
Singers from Montreal
Green Party of Canada candidates in the 2019 Canadian federal election